The fifth season of Dance Moms, an American dance reality television created by Collins Avenue Productions, began airing on January 6, 2015 on Lifetime's television network. The season concluded on August 18, 2015. A total of 32 official episodes and 2 special episodes (Girl Talk 2, Slumber Party!) aired this season.

Cast
The fifth season featured nine star billing cast members, with various other dancers and moms appearing throughout the season. This season is the first to feature JoJo Siwa and Brynn Rumfallo.

Choreographers and Instructors
 Abby Lee Miller
 Gianna Martello
 Cathy Nesbitt-Stein (Candy Apples Dance Center)
 Erin Rich-Stein (Candy Apples Dance Center)
 Molly Long (Dance Precisions Dance Studio)
 Erin Babbs (Murrieta Dance Project)
 Alexa Moffett (Club Dance Studio)
 Jeanette Cota (JC's Broadway Dance Academy)
 Chehon Wespi-Tschopp (Millennium Dance Complex)
 Travis Payne

Dancers
 Nia Frazier
 Kalani Hilliker
 JoJo Siwa
 Maddie Ziegler
 Mackenzie Ziegler
 Kendall Vertes

Moms
 Melissa Gisoni
 Holly Frazier
 Jill Vertes
 Kira Girard 
 Jessalynn Siwa

Guest Dancers/Moms
 Sarah Hunt – ALDC Pittsburgh dancer (episode 3)
 Christy Hunt – ALDC Pittsburgh mom (episode 3)
 Sarah Reasons – former ALDC Junior Select Ensemble dancer (episodes 7 & 8)
 Tracey Reasons – former ALDC Junior Select Ensemble mom (episodes 7 & 8)
 Brynn Rumfallo – ALDC guest dancer (episodes 7-10)
 Ashlee Allen – ALDC guest mom (episodes 7-10)

Candy Apples Dance Center
(NOTE: The following pairs list the dancer first and the mom second. In Season 5 Episode 28, the competition team effectively disbanded, with its dancers reforming into Jeanette's BDA team.)
 Vivi-Anne Stein and Cathy Nesbitt-Stein
 Alyssa and Meredith Chi
 Evan and Vida Gorbell
 Gavin, McKenzie, and Jo Anne Morales
 Lucas and Brigette Triana
 Ava and Jeanette Cota
 Haley and Melanie Huelsman
 Tessa and Renée Wilkinson
 Chloe and Liza Smith
 Ashtin and Jennifer Roth
 Kaycee and Laura Rice

Cast duration

Notes
 Key:  = featured in this episode
 Key:  = not featured in this episode
 Key:  = joins the Abby Lee Dance Company
 Key:  = returns to the Abby Lee Dance Company

Episodes

References

General references 
 

2015 American television seasons